Sphaeniscus sexmaculatus is a species of tephritid or fruit flies in the genus Sphaeniscus of the family Tephritidae.

Distribution
Sudan South to South Africa, Madagascar, Réunion, Mauritius.

References

Tephritinae
Insects described in 1843
Diptera of Asia